Christina Chang (born 29 June 1971) is a Taiwanese actress, who has appeared in 24, CSI: Miami, and Nashville.  Currently she plays Dr. Audrey Lim, Chief of Surgery, on The Good Doctor.

Early life
Chang was born and raised in Taipei, Taiwan, to a Taiwanese Filipino father and an American mother. She attended Taipei American School and is fluent in Mandarin. At the age of 17, she moved to the United States to study theatre and film at the University of Kansas in her mother's home state of Kansas. Later, she moved to Seattle, Washington where she graduated from the University of Washington. After graduation, she got her first acting role in Naomi's Road at the Children's theatre in Seattle. and then appeared in an off-Broadway play by Tina Landau.

Career
Chang later moved to New York City and guest starred in various television programs including Cosby and As the World Turns. She earned feature film roles in such films as 28 Days and Random Hearts. Chang is best known for her roles on television. She had a regular role on ABC series Dragnet (2003–2004), and played recurring roles on 24 as Dr. Sunny Macer, and as State Attorney Rebecca Nevins on CSI: Miami. In 2010, Chang was cast as a regular in ABC's series No Ordinary Family, but exited after two episodes. She also appeared in Once and Again, Boston Legal, Close to Home, Brothers & Sisters, Private Practice, Suits, The Mentalist (s2, eps5) and Desperate Housewives. In 2013 she was cast in another recurring role, in the second season of the ABC drama series Nashville, as Megan Vannoy, Charles Esten's character's love interest. In 2014, Chang was cast in the ABC drama pilot Sea Of Fire, opposite Jennifer Carpenter. She also had a recurring role as Kiki, Vince Korsak’s life coach, then love interest and wife, in Rizzoli & Isles in Season 6 & 7. Since 2017, Chang has played Dr. Audrey Lim on The Good Doctor.

Filmography

Film

Television

References

External links
 
 
 

Living people
20th-century American actresses
21st-century American actresses
Actresses from Taipei
Actresses from Washington (state)
American actresses of Filipino descent
American actresses of Taiwanese descent
American film actresses
American television actresses
Taiwanese emigrants to the United States
University of Washington School of Medicine alumni
1971 births